The 1935–36 international cricket season was from September 1935 to April 1936.

Season overview

October

Australia in Ceylon

November

Australia in South Africa

December

Australia in India

MCC in Australia

January

MCC in New Zealand

February

Yorkshire in Jamaica

References

International cricket competitions by season
1935 in cricket
1936 in cricket